Kookaburra is an Australian sports equipment company, specialising in Australian rules football, cricket, and field hockey equipment, named after the Australian kingfisher. The company notably manufactures the most widely used brand of ball used in One-day internationals and Test cricket.

History 
The company was founded in 1890 as A.G. Thompson Pty Ltd by Alfred Grace Thompson, a migrant harness and saddle maker who turned to manufacturing cricket balls when his livelihood was threatened by the advent of the motor car. In the mid-1980s, the company diversified into manufacturing the full range of cricket bats, clothing, footwear and protective equipment.

In addition to its Australian operations, Kookaburra has offices in the United Kingdom, New Zealand, South Africa, Bangladesh and India. Kookaburra's Turf Cricket Ball has been used exclusively in Australia, New Zealand and South African Test Cricket since 1946.

The company sponsors a junior cricket tournament called the Kookaburra Cup. It also has endorsement deals with many players including former Australia Captain Ricky Ponting and Martin Guptill of New Zealand.

Current ranges of equipment are Kahuna, Fever, Ghost, Rapid, Rampage, Shadow, Beast, and Patriot, an exclusive range sold at the Greg Chappell Cricket Centre. Previous ranges include Diablo, Ridgeback, Genesis, Blade, Sword, Ice, CCX, XLR8, Blaze and Surge.

Kookaburra also manufacture hockey sticks and equipment which are used by many top international players such Liam De Young, Charlotte Craddock, Madonna Blyth and Marsha Marescia. Flagship stick models include the Phoenix L-Bow and the Dragon M-Bow stick.

The Kookaburra Dimple Elite hockey ball has been used in all Olympic Games since 1984.

Products

See also

 List of fitness wear brands
 List of sporting goods manufacturers
 List of companies of Australia

References
 
The white ball wonder, Cricinfo, 20 January 2006.
Watts, Robert: MCC's silly point, The Daily Telegraph, 4 March 2006.

External links
 

Australian brands
Sportswear brands
Manufacturing companies established in 1890
1890 establishments in Australia
Cricket equipment manufacturers
Manufacturing companies based in Melbourne
Sporting goods manufacturers of Australia